The 1863 New Hampshire gubernatorial election was held on March 10, 1863.

Incumbent Republican Governor Nathaniel S. Berry did not stand for re-election.

Republican nominee Joseph A. Gilmore defeated Democratic nominee Ira Allen Eastman and Union Democrat Walter Harriman.

Since no candidate received a majority in the popular vote, Gilmore was elected by the New Hampshire General Court per the state constitution.

General election

Candidates
Ira Allen Eastman, Democratic, former U.S. Representative, former judge of the New Hampshire Supreme Court
Joseph A. Gilmore, Republican, former President of the New Hampshire Senate
Walter Harriman, Union (or War) Democrat, colonel of the 11th New Hampshire Regiment, former State Senator

Results

Legislative election
As no candidate received a majority of the vote, the New Hampshire General Court was required to decide the election, both Houses in convention choosing among the top two vote-getters, Eastman and Gilmore. The legislative election was held on June 4, 1863.

Notes

References

1863
New Hampshire
Gubernatorial